Bon Palashir Padabali is a Bengali romance drama Film directed, produced and screenplayed by Uttam Kumar. It is an adaptation of a 1960 same name novel by Ramapada Chowdhury. This is a dream project for Uttam and one of the second film where he directed. The film was released on 9 February 1973, under the banner of Uttam' foundation Shilpi Sangsad. The film became a success at the box office. This is multi-starred film, starring Uttam himself with Supriya Devi, Anil Chatterjee, Bikash Roy and many others.

Plot
Girijaprasad Roy was a good student who secured first Division in the final exam. He was fond of Chhotoma whose husband was Bibhuti, the very first scholar of the village before Girija. Bibhuti changed his religion to Christianity so Chhotoma refused to go with him to City after death of Bibhuti's elder brother, Kalidas, who was a religious person and a critic of Bibhuti's religious transformation. Besides, Girija left his village for higher studies and came back after a long time. All of his villagers believed him to be rich. After a few days, everyone learned of his poor financial condition. His only daughter Bimala was attracted to Block Development Officer Pravakar. As Girijaprasad was not rich, everybody tried to neglect him and helped his only brother Girin who stayed in the same village. Girin was a wealthy and clever man. He deprived his elder brother and tried to make relation with Pravakar. But in the end, Girija's daughter Bimala was married to Pravakar instead of Girin's daughter Tia in the intervention of Girin's wife. On the other hand, Udas Kotal a soft-hearted, honest man wanted to learn driving for a better life. He married Laxmimoni to learn driving from his father-in-law. Laxmimoni's father taught him driving and made him an expert driver. Unfortunately, Laxmimoni had some psychological problem and as a result, she killed herself. Udas became very upset and after few days, he wanted to get married his childhood friend Padma but Padma refused to get married. Day by day Udas became an alcoholic, characterless bohemian kind of person. One day after a quarrel, he hears baseless and incorrect news that Padma was having an affair with the doctor, he goes to murder the doctor with a knife. In the darkness, drunken Udas killed his old mate Padma. As a result, he was convicted and sentenced to death. Doctor left the village.

Cast
 Uttam Kumar as Udas
 Supriya Devi as Padma
 Bikash Roy as Girija Prasada
 Anil Chatterjee as Doctor
 Madhabi Mukherjee
 Jahor Roy
 Molina Devi as Atta maa
 Basabi Nandi

Production
This is the second film directed by Uttam Kumar after Sudhu Ekti Bochor in 1966 under his own foundation Shilpi Sangshad. Uttam want to make this film to help the poor artists and technicians. For his request every top artists and Uttam himself worked without any fees. Uttam also do screenplay and background music.

Soundtrack

Reception
Uttam Kumar’s massive melodrama about passion, violence and politics in the small village of Bon Palashi. The film is narrated through two sets of characters whose stories are intercut and eventually merged. The first is the family of Girijaprasad, a retired and now impoverished school principal. His inability to invest in the progress of the village has the natives looking for a new leader in his former schoolmate, the businessman Abani. A long flashback, featuring the tragic history of Abani’s old aunt (Molina Devi), serves to frame Girijaprasad’s present crisis: his scheming brother offers the fiance of Girijaprasad’s daughter Bimala a larger dowry to marry his own daughter instead. The second protagonist is the peasant Udas (Uttam Kumar), who loves the good Padma (Choudhury) but is forced to marry the neurotic Laxmi (Nandi) in order to be allowed to learn to drive a bus. Laxmi kills Padma’s father and then commits suicide. Udas tries to get Padma to elope with him but he ends up trying to rape her and, eventually, he kills Padma. Plans to develop the village loom large in the melodrama but the film impresses mainly through its scale (the title means The Songs of Bon Palashi) and its recourse to several acting idioms, including folk theatre. 

Uttam direction was huge praised by the critics. Hindustan Standard wrote that time 'In Uttam Kumar we have found a director who shows his brilliance on diverse levels. That is main again in Bon Pilashir Padabali, whose 20,000 and odd feer are studded with sparklis of present achievement and future promise.' The film become blockbuster hit at the box office and become golden jubilee hit.

Awards
BFJA Awards 1974
1974: BFJA Award for Best Supporting Actress - Basabi Nandi
1974: BFJA Award for Best Lyricist - Gouri Prassanno Majumder
1974: BFJA Award for Best Male Playback Singer - Dwijen Mukheejee

References

External links
 

1973 films
Indian romantic drama films
Films based on short fiction
1973 romantic drama films
Films based on Indian novels
Films based on works by Ramapada Chowdhury